HUMANFOLK is the musical collaboration and concept band of guitarist-composer Johnny Alegre with the New York–based Fil-Am percussionist Susie Ibarra and her husband, drummer Roberto Juan Rodriguez, together with the multi-instrumentalist Cynthia Alexander and the electronica exponent Malek Lopez. This collective is a pioneering effort marking the convergence in a contemporary Philippine setting of multiple musical idioms (jazz, rock, electronic music, kulintang, agung and indigenous percussion, with Iberian and folk music influences). The group's name is a deliberate conjoining of the words "human" and "folk", akin to "menfolk" and "womenfolk", without prejudice to gender and frequently set in all caps to distinguish it from a dictionary term.

History

The band started as a collaboration of musicians in the summer of 2008. The introduction of Alegre, Ibarra and Rodriguez at the United States Embassy in Manila spurred a series of musical and social interactions. The impetus culminated in the recording sessions for the "Humanfolk Suite", a world music cycle composed by Alegre, for which Alexander and Lopez completed the HUMANFOLK quintet. 

Towards October 2008, the threesome of Alegre, Alexander, and Lopez performed a live semi-improvised score for a short, silent film by Sasha Palomares, entitled Une Femme Andalouse, which was awarded the KODAK Best 16mm Experimental Film in that year by the Kodak Filmschool Competition. They were subsequently invited to perform at the 4th Philippine International Jazz & Arts Festival in February 2009, and a live collaborative performance with the Australian didgeridoo virtuoso William Barton in January 2010, that also introduced vocalist-keyboardist  Abby Clutario as a new principal member of the group. These appearances and many others that followed led to the release by MCA Music (Universal Music Group) of Humanfolk's eponymous album in May 2011.

In 2012, Humanfolk was conferred an Awit Award for the song "Para Sa Tao", as Best World Music Recording by the Philippine Association of the Record Industry (PARI).  Upon the exodus of two founding members, Cynthia Alexander (for the United States) and Malek Lopez (for Singapore), Alegre and Clutario have continued as Humanfolk's principal members in a configuration described as Mark II, which was introduced in 2013 before international audiences in Singapore's Mosaic Music Festival and Malaysia's Kota Kinabalu Jazz Festival. In the Philippines, the group performed at the 2nd CCP International Jazz Festival in September 2013, and recorded the promotional EP, Ephipany. In January 2015, the group performed in India at the Saarang International Cultural Festival organized by IIT Madras.  Towards the end of 2015, the group was joined by vocalist and rhythm guitarist Kris Gorra Dancel; and session percussionist Deej Rodriguez.  This expanded group, described as Mark III, recorded the year-end extended play Naglalarong Ilaw, an independent release.

Members

Principal members 
 Johnny Alegre - guitars, bungkaka,  piano, tambourine, vocals
 Susie Ibarra - kulintang, kulintang a kayo, drum kit, vocals and handclaps
 Cynthia Alexander - guitars, bass, agung, vocals, bungkaka, tongatong 
  Roberto Juan Rodriguez - drum kit, cajón, bongos
 Malek Lopez - computer, sound design, keyboards
 Abby Clutario - vocals, keyboards, Chapman Stick

Mark II 
 Johnny Alegre - guitars, percussion, vocals
 Abby Clutario - vocals, keyboards, Chapman Stick
 Yuna Reguerra (1) - bass
 Rodney Vidanes (2) - bass
 Paolo Manuel (1) - drums
 Zach Lucero (2) - drums

Mark III 
 Johnny Alegre - guitars, percussion, vocals
 Kris Gorra Dancel - vocals, rhythm guitar,
 Abby Clutario - vocals, keyboards, Chapman Stick
 Rodney Vidanes - bass
 Zach Lucero - drums
 Deej Rodriguez - percussion

Mark IV 

Johnny Alegre - guitars, percussion, vocals
 Kris Gorra Dancel - vocals, rhythm guitar,
 Abby Clutario - vocals, keyboards, Chapman Stick
Tusa Montes - kulintang, sarunai, percussion

Discography

Videography

Awards

References

External links
 
 
  Humanfolk on All About Jazz
 Humanfolk on ReverbNation

Filipino-American musical groups
Filipino folk music groups
Kulintang instrumentalists
Musical groups established in 2008
Musical groups from New York City